The fourth season of Family Guy aired on Fox from May 1, 2005, to May 21, 2006, and consisted of thirty episodes, making it the longest season to date. The first half of the season is included within the volume 3 DVD box set, which was released on November 29, 2005, and the second half is included within the volume 4 DVD box set, which was released on November 14, 2006. Volume 4 was split into seasons 4 and 5 in regions outside the United States, leading to confusion over season numbers between U.S., Australian, and UK consumers. The last three episodes of season 4 were the basis for the movie known as Stewie Griffin: The Untold Story, and are edited for content; Fox does not include these episodes in the official episode count.

Family Guy had been canceled in 2002 due to low ratings, but was revived by Fox after reruns on Adult Swim became the network's most-watched program, and more than three million DVDs of the show were sold. "North by North Quahog" was the first episode to air following the series' revival.

The executive producers for the fourth production season are series creator Seth MacFarlane, along with David A. Goodman and Chris Sheridan. Starting with this season, MacFarlane would hand over showrunner duties to two writers, with Goodman and Sheridan being the inaugural co-showrunners.

Production
The show was first canceled after the 1999–2000 season, but following a last-minute reprieve, it returned for a third season in 2001. In 2002, Family Guy was canceled after three seasons due to low ratings. Fox tried to sell rights for reruns of the show, but it was hard to find networks that were interested; Cartoon Network eventually bought the rights, " basically for free", according to the president of 20th Century Fox Television Production. When the reruns were shown on Cartoon Network's Adult Swim in 2003, Family Guy became the channel's most-watched show with an average 1.9 million viewers per episode. Following this, the show's first season was released on DVD in April 2003. The DVD set sold 2.2 million copies, making it the best-selling television DVD of 2003 and the second highest-selling television DVD ever, behind the first season of Comedy Central's Chappelle's Show. The season 2 DVD release also sold more than 1 million copies. The show's popularity in both DVD sales and reruns rekindled Fox's interest. They ordered 35 new episodes in 2004, marking the first revival of a television show based on DVD sales. Gail Berman said cancelling the show was one of her most difficult decisions, and she was therefore happy it would return. The network also began production of a film based on the show.

"North by North Quahog" was the first episode to be broadcast after the show's cancellation. It was written by Seth MacFarlane and directed by Peter Shin. MacFarlane believed the show's three-year hiatus was beneficial because animated shows do not normally have hiatuses, and towards the end of their seasons "... you see a lot more sex jokes and (bodily function) jokes and signs of a fatigued staff that their brains are just fried". With "North by North Quahog", the writing staff tried to keep the show "... exactly as it was" before its cancellation, and did not "... have the desire to make it any slicker" than it already was. Walter Murphy, who had composed music for the show before its cancellation, returned to compose the music for "North by North Quahog". Murphy and the orchestra recorded an arrangement of Bernard Herrmann's score from North by Northwest, a film referenced multiple times in the episode.

Fox had ordered five episode scripts at the end of the third season; these episodes had been written but not produced. One of these scripts was adapted into "North by North Quahog". The original script featured Star Wars character Boba Fett, and later actor, writer and producer Aaron Spelling, but the release of the iconic film The Passion of the Christ inspired the writers to incorporate Mel Gibson into the episode. Multiple endings were written, including one in which Death comes for Gibson. During production, an episode of South Park was released entitled "The Passion of the Jew" that also featured Gibson as a prominent character. This gave the Family Guy writers pause, fearing accusations " that we had ripped them off."

Episodes

Reception

Ratings 
This season received high Nielsen ratings; "North by North Quahog", the premiere episode was broadcast as part of an animated television night on Fox, alongside two episodes of The Simpsons and the pilot episode of American Dad!. The episode was watched by 11.85 million viewers, the show's highest ratings since the airing of the first season episode "Brian: Portrait of a Dog". Its ratings also surpassed the ratings of both episodes of The Simpsons and American Dad!. Season four's three-part finale was watched by 8.2 million viewers, bringing the season average to 7.9 million viewers per episode.

Awards and nominations 
This season was nominated for a number of awards. In 2005, the Academy of Television Arts & Sciences nominated "North by North Quahog" for a Primetime Emmy Award for Outstanding Animated Program (for Programming Less Than One Hour). It nominated "PTV" in the same category one year later. Neither of the episodes won the award, as South Park received the award in 2005 and The Simpsons was the eventual recipient of the award in 2006. Peter Shin and Dan Povenmire were both nominated for an Annie Award in the Best Directing in an Animated Television Production category, for directing "North by North Quahog" and "PTV" respectively; Shin eventually won the award. MacFarlane won the Annie Award for Best Voice-over Performance for providing the voice of Stewie in "Brian the Bachelor". At the Annie Awards the following year, John Viener was nominated in the category Writing in an Animated Television Production, for writing "Untitled Griffin Family History", but lost the award to Ian Maxtone-Graham, who wrote the episode of The Simpsons titled "The Seemingly Neverending Story". The editors of the episode "Blind Ambition" won the Motion Picture Sound Editors Golden Reel Award for Best Sound Editing in Television Animated.

Critical reception 
Season 4 received widespread critical acclaim from critics. Reviewing the season premiere, Mark McGuire of The Times Union wrote: "... the first minute or so of the resurrected Family Guy ranks among the funniest 60 seconds I've seen so far this season." The Pitt News reviewer John Nigro felt that the show had not lost its steam while it was on hiatus, and was surprised that the show had been canceled because of its "wildly extravagant shock factor". Nigro cited "Breaking Out Is Hard to Do", "Petarded" and "Perfect Castaway" as the season's best episodes. In 2007, BBC Three named the episode "PTV" "The Best Episode...So Far". The episode has also been praised by Maureen Ryan of the Chicago Tribune, who called it "Family Guys most rebellious outing yet". The Boston Globe critic Matthew Gilbert felt Family Guys fourth season was as "crankily irreverent as ever".

Fewer critics responded negatively to the season; Seattle Post-Intelligencer critic Melanie McFarland reacted very bitterly, stating "Three years off the air has not made the Family Guy team that much more creative". Critics of both PopMatters and IGN criticized the first few episodes but felt the show regained its humor after "Don't Make Me Over"; IGN's Mike Drucker commented "At that point, we get some amazingly creative humor. It's almost like MacFarlane and gang decided they had thanked their fans enough and could return to what made the show successful in the first place." Media watchdog group the Parents Television Council, a frequent critic of the show, branded the episodes "North by North Quahog", "The Father, the Son, and the Holy Fonz", "Brian Sings and Swings", "Patriot Games", and "The Courtship of Stewie's Father" as "worst show of the week".

Notes

References

External links
 

2005 American television seasons
2006 American television seasons
 
Family Guy seasons